Great House may refer to:

 a great house, a large residence and its associated household, especially in the context of the Victorian and Edwardian era

Buildings
 Great House (St. Augustine, Maryland), U.S.
 Great House (Cape Ann), Massachusetts, U.S.
 Great House, Colyton, Devon, England
 Great House, Laugharne, Carmarthenshire, Wales
 Great House, Llanarth, Monmouthshire, Wales
 Great House, Llanover, Monmouthshire, Wales
 Great House at Sonning, Berkshire, England
 Great House, Bristol, England, at the site of the later Bristol Beacon
 Great house (pueblo), a type of structure found in New Mexico, U.S.

Arts and entertainment
 The Great House (film), a 1975 Spanish drama
 Great House (novel), by Nicole Krauss, 2010
 The Great House (novel), by Cynthia Harnett, 1949
 Great Houses, in the Dune universe
 Great Houses, in the BattleTech franchise
 Great Houses, in A Song of Ice and Fire
 Great Houses of Gallifrey in Doctor Who.

Other uses 
 Seven Great Houses of Iran, seven feudal aristocracies 
 a translation of the title Pharaoh

See also

English country house
Estate houses in Scotland
Manor house
Mansion